The Tennessee House of Representatives 21st district in the United States is one of 99 legislative districts included in the lower house of the Tennessee General Assembly. It covers the northern and central portions of Monroe County, such as Vonore, Madisonville, and Sweetwater; and the southern and central portions of Loudon County, such as Greenback, Philadelphia, and Loudon. The district has been represented by Lowell Russell, since 2019.

Demographics 

 90.1% of the district is Caucasian
 1.8% of the district is African American
 3.6% of the district is Hispanic
 0.5% of the district is Asian-American
 1.5% of the district is mixed
 0.2% of district is other

Representatives

Recent election results 
The following are the recent election results for the district. The incumbent representative, Russell, has ran unopposed in both primaries and general elections since 2020.

2022

2020

References 

Tennessee House of Representatives districts